The Stag (known as The Bachelor Weekend in some regions) is a 2013 Irish film directed by John Butler in his feature début and written by Butler and Peter McDonald.

Plot
A stag weekend in the great outdoors in the west of Ireland takes some unexpected detours.

Arrow Films' synopsis of The Stag is as follows: "Self-confessed metrosexual Fionnán doesn't want a stag do, but would happily attend the Hen. Ruth, the now concerned bride-to-be (Amy Huberman), promptly persuades the, marginally more-macho, best man (Andrew Scott) to organise one. Reluctantly, he agrees but proceeds to do everything he can to stop Ruth's wildly infamous brother, known only as The Machine (Peter McDonald), coming along for their sober, walking-weekend, excuse for a stag party. But The Machine, not so easily fixed, tracks them down, and what follows is a hilarious few days in rural Ireland where the Stags find themselves lost, shot at, stoned and butt-naked. The Stag is a hilarious and heart-warming journey of friendship, fear, male bonding, and tightly fashioned squirrel skin!"

Cast
 Andrew Scott as Davin
 Hugh O'Conor as Fionnán
 Peter McDonald as The Machine (Richard)
 Brian Gleeson as Simon
 Andrew Bennett as Enormous Kevin
 Michael Legge as Little Kevin
 Amy Huberman as Ruth

Release
After being included in the line-up at the Toronto International Film Festival in September 2013, the film was released in Ireland on 7 March 2014 and 14 March in the UK. It received its US première at the 2014 Tribeca Film Festival in April. For the US release the film was retitled The Bachelor Weekend.

Reception 
 

Mark Kermode gave the film 3/5 stars.

Ryan McNeil described it as 'an unexpected gem' with 'some of the most honest performances you're likely to see, and more brains, heart, and courage than any Hollywood comedy dare put forward.'

Awards
The Stag has been nominated for Best Irish Film at the 11th Irish Film & Television Awards.

References

External links
 
 

2013 films
2013 comedy films
Films set in Ireland
Films shot in the Republic of Ireland
Irish comedy films
2010s English-language films